Dirina sorocarpa is a species of saxicolous (rock-dwelling), crustose lichen in the family Roccellaceae. Found in Cape Verde, it was formally described as a new species in 2013 by Anders Tehler and Damien Ertz. The lichen has a creamy white to white-brownish thallus measuring 0.1–0.5 mm thick and a chalk-like medulla. Its ascospores are 21–30 by 4–5 μm.

References

sorocarpa
Lichen species
Lichens described in 2013
Lichens of Macaronesia